Sherman Albert Bernard Sr. (June 10, 1925 – May 11, 2012) was an American businessman from Jefferson Parish in the New Orleans suburbs, who served from 1972 to 1988 as the Louisiana Commissioner of Insurance. He is mainly remembered for having served forty-one months in federal prison after he pleaded guilty in federal court to extortion in connection with his job duties.

Background
Bernard was born in Schriever in Terrebonne Parish in south Louisiana, one of two sons and seven daughters of Thomas Joseph Bernard (1881–1947) and the former Helen Lucille Orillion (1886–1975), a native of Lafourche Parish. His brother, Andrew Bernard Sr., died in 1952 at the age of thirty-two. Bernard graduated from Terrebonne High School in Houma in Terrebonne Parish. He served in the United States Marine Corps during World War II. Early in his career he was an officer of the Louisiana State Police. At the time he entered the race for state insurance commissioner, Bernard was in the house moving, trucking, and construction business in Westwego on the West Bank of the Mississippi River in Jefferson Parish.

State politics
In 1968, Bernard was elected to the Louisiana Democratic State Central Committee. In December 1971, he upset Insurance Commissioner Dudley A. Guglielmo of Baton Rouge in the Democratic runoff election. On February 1, 1972, he defeated the Republican nominee, W. G. "Billy" Haynes of West Monroe in northeastern Louisiana. Bernard polled 723,681 votes (73.2 percent) to Haynes' 265,056 (26.8 percent). Bernard won sixty-three parishes, having lost only in Haynes' Ouachita Parish, where he still polled 49.5 percent of the vote. In that same election, the Democrat Edwin Edwards, then of Crowley in Acadia Parish, defeated Republican gubernatorial nominee David C. Treen, then of Jefferson Parish

In 1974, Bernard challenged U.S. Senator Russell B. Long in the Democratic primary but received little support. Long was so popular that year that state Republican chairman James H. Boyce of Baton Rouge complained of being unable to find a candidate to oppose him. Bernard was nevertheless reelected as insurance commissioner the next year in 1975 in the first election ever held in Louisiana under the nonpartisan blanket primary system. He handily defeated the former Mayor Victor H. Schiro of New Orleans, an insurance agent by occupation. In 1979, Bernard turned aside a strong challenge for reelection from State Senator Don W. Williamson of Caddo Parish, then a Democrat. A third candidate was the Republican W. L. "Bud" Gaiennie, an insurance agent from Theriot in Bernard's native Terrebonne Parish. Previously a party activist in Williamson's Caddo Parish, Gaiennie called himself a "very strict constitutional conservative" and claimed that insurance rates could be lowered by replacing the oversight of the insurance commissioner. Gaiennie drew only 72,266 votes in the primary. In the runoff, Bernard narrowly defeated Williamson, who had the support of the popular Public Broadcasting Service chef and humorist Justin Wilson. Bernard polled 627,247 votes (50.3 percent) to Williamson's 618,952 (49.7 percent).

In 1983, Bernard was forced for his final term as insurance commissioner into a general election, popularly called the runoff in Louisiana, with the Republican candidate, Dave Brennan, an insurance executive. In the primary, Bernard led with 652,060 votes (46.7 percent); Brennan trailed with 362,147 (26 percent). Bernard won his fourth and final term as commissioner in the general election, having polled 553,230 votes (54.9 percent) to Brennan's 453,793 (46.1 percent). Turnout dipped sharply in the second race because there was no gubernatorial contest at the top of the ticket, as Edwin Edwards had unseated David Treen in the primary.

In the September 27, 1986, primary for the U.S. Senate seat finally vacated by Russell Long, Bernard finished in fourth place with 52,075 votes (4.4 percent), three more than the fifth-place candidate, fellow Democrat J. E. Jumonville, Jr. Victory for the seat ultimately went to another Democrat, U.S. Representative John Breaux of Crowley of Louisiana's 7th congressional district, who defeated the Republican choice, U.S. Representative Henson Moore of Baton Rouge of Louisiana's 6th congressional district.

Bernard was ousted from office in the 1987 nonpartisan blanket primary by fellow Democrat Douglas D. "Doug" Green of Baton Rouge, 773,026 (55.3 percent) to 456,539 (32.6 percent).

Although Green had run on a platform to clean up irregularities in the department – he even called himself "Mr. Clean" – Green was subsequently implicated in the Champion insurance scandal and was sentenced to twenty-five years in prison, a far longer period than Bernard would later serve. Champion was found to have made more than $2 million in campaign contributions to Green in exchange for regulatory favors.

Arrest and Trial
Bernard was the first of three successive insurance commissioners to be convicted and serve time in federal prison for unrelated crimes. He confessed in 1993 to having extorted $80,000 during the 1980s; the money was disguised as campaign contributions from insurance companies in return for obtaining operating licenses in Louisiana. State Representative Harry Hollins of Calcasieu Parish led a legislative committee in 1978 which began investigating Bernard.

He pleaded guilty to one count of extortion and served his sentence during the middle 1990s in the federal prison in Montgomery, Alabama.

Bernard recalled that he had a view of the Alabama State Capitol from the prison bus that took him daily to his job changing light bulbs and sweeping a large auditorium. He was released on September 20, 1996.

Comeback
In 1991, Bernard tried to return to the insurance commissioner's office, but he finished the primary with just under 19 percent of the vote.

Victory instead went to James H. "Jim" Brown, the former Louisiana Secretary of State who was earlier a state senator from Ferriday in Concordia Parish in eastern Louisiana. Green did not seek reelection in 1991. After his reelection to a third term in 1999, Brown was forced in 2003 to resign the office and was sentenced to six months in the Federal Correctional Institution in Oakdale, Louisiana, for lying to an agent of the Federal Bureau of Investigation, a charge that Brown repeatedly repudiated in his book Justice Denied but one which ruined his political career. The Oakdale facility is where former governor Edwin Edwards spent the latter portion of his own prison sentence for racketeering.

Death

The Roman Catholic Bernard died in his sleep at the age of eighty-six at his home in Marrero, also in Jefferson Parish. Bernard and his wife, the late Julia Speranza Bernard, had six children: Sherman Bernard, Jr., and wife, Denise, Dale Bernard, the late Dennis Bernard, Linda Bernard Zimmerman and husband, Harry, Deana Benard, and Victor Bernard and wife, Scarlet. Though his parents are interred at St Joseph Cemetery in Thibodaux, Bernard is interred at Garden of Memories in Marrero.

References

1925 births
2012 deaths
People from Terrebonne Parish, Louisiana
Terrebonne High School alumni
People from Marrero, Louisiana
Politicians from New Orleans
American police officers
Businesspeople from Louisiana
Louisiana insurance commissioners
Louisiana Democrats
United States Marines
United States Marine Corps personnel of World War II
American prisoners and detainees
Louisiana politicians convicted of crimes
People from Westwego, Louisiana
Military personnel from Louisiana
Burials in Louisiana
20th-century American businesspeople